Sangh Priya Gautam (b 1931) is a former Union minister of state for agro and rural industries of India. He was minister in Atal Bihari Vajpayee ministry around 2001. He was born in 1931 in Bulandshahr district in Uttar Pradesh in India and studied at law Aligarh Muslim University. A Lawyer by profession, he was elected to Rajya Sabha in 1990 and in 1998 as a candidate of Bharatiya Janata Party.

He was BJP candidate for Hapur (Lok Sabha constituency) in 1984 when he came third. Later he was elected to Rajya Sabha twice. After the defeat of Vajpayee Government in 2004 General Election, Shri Gautam started to complain about being sidelined in the party and was suspended in 2006 for anti-party activities. He was admitted back in the party in 2011. Even in 2010s after re-joining BJP, he continued to be a vocal critic of the party.

See also 
Sanghmitra Maurya, a woman leader of the same party (BJP) in UP in 2010s, with a similar name which causes confusion for some people

References 

People from Bulandshahr
Rajya Sabha members from Uttar Pradesh
Year of birth missing (living people)
Living people
Bharatiya Janshakti Party politicians
Rajya Sabha members from Uttarakhand
Bharatiya Janata Party politicians from Uttar Pradesh
Rajya Sabha members from the Bharatiya Janata Party
Bharatiya Janata Party politicians from Uttarakhand